An .htaccess (hypertext access) file is a directory-level configuration file supported by several web servers, used for configuration of website-access issues, such as URL redirection, URL shortening, access control (for different web pages and files), and more. The 'dot' (period or full stop) before the file name makes it a hidden file in Unix-based environments.

A site could have more than one .htaccess file, and the files are placed inside the web tree (i.e. inside directories and their sub-directories), and hence their other name distributed configuration files.

.htaccess files act as a subset of the server's global configuration file (like httpd.conf) for the directory that they are in, or all sub-directories.

The original purpose of .htaccess—reflected in its name—was to allow per-directory access control by, for example, requiring a password to access World Wide Web content. More commonly, however, the .htaccess files define or override many other configuration settings such as content type, character set, Common Gateway Interface handlers, etc.

Format and language
.htaccess files are written in the Apache Directives variant of the Perl Compatible Regular Expressions (PCRE) language. Learning basic PCRE itself can help in mastering work with these files.

For historical reasons, the format of .htaccess files is a limited subset of the Apache HTTP server's global configuration file httpd.conf even when used with web servers such as Oracle iPlanet Web Server and Zeus Web Server which have very different native global configuration files.

Common usage
 Authorization, authentication A .htaccess file is often used to specify security restrictions for a directory, hence the filename "access". The .htaccess file is often accompanied by a .htpasswd file which stores valid usernames and their passwords.
 URL rewriting Servers often use .htaccess for rewriting long, overly comprehensive URLs to shorter and more memorable ones.
 Blocking (access control) Use allow/deny to block users by IP address or domain. Also used to block bad bots, rippers and referrers. Often used to restrict access by web crawlers.
 SSI Enable server-side includes.
 Directory listing Control how the server will react when no specific web page is specified.
 Customized error responses Changing the page that is shown when a server-side error occurs, for example HTTP 404 Not Found or, to indicate to a search engine that a page has moved, HTTP 301 Moved Permanently.
 MIME types Instruct the server how to treat different varying file types.
 Cache control .htaccess files allow a server to control caching by web browsers and proxies to speed up websites, reduce bandwidth usage, server load, and perceived lag. .htaccess also adds the cache age to the webpage resources so that on revisiting the page, the elements are reloaded from browser cache till the age mentioned expires, instead of requesting the resource again from the server.
 HTTPS & HSTS Implementation of both HTTPS and HSTS on Apache servers is largely dependent on correct URL rewriting & header information mentioned in .htaccess file. Any incorrect syntax in the file while deploying HTTPS or HSTS leads to a failure in implementation.

Advantages
 Immediate changes Because .htaccess files are read on every request, changes made in these files take immediate effect – as opposed to the main configuration file, which requires the server to be restarted for the new settings to take effect.
 Non-privileged users For servers with multiple users, such as on shared web hosting, it is often desirable to allow individual users the ability to alter their site configuration. The use of .htaccess files allows such individualization, and by unprivileged users – because the main server configuration files do not need to be changed.

Disadvantages
Controlling Apache using the main server configuration file httpd.conf is often preferred for security and performance reasons:
 Performance loss For each HTTP request, there are additional file-system accesses for parent directories when using .htaccess, to check for possibly existing .htaccess files in those parent directories which are allowed to hold .htaccess files. It is possible to programatically migrate directives from .htaccess to httpd.conf if this performance loss is a concern.
 Security Allowing individual users to modify the configuration of a server can cause security concerns if not set up properly.
 Syntax .htaccess is usually very sensitive to syntax errors. Due to this any misspellings may lead to server errors and web resources in the directory with the erroneous .htaccess not being displayed at all.

In popular culture

Portions of the 2020 video game Mackerelmedia Fish, which explores themes of Internet culture, have been implemented directly on a website's open .htaccess directories.

See also
Semantic URL
Rewrite engine

References

External links
Apache Docs Tutorial: .htaccess files

Configuration files
Web technology